Love Among the Ruins (1997) is the sixth studio album by American alternative rock band 10,000 Maniacs and the first to feature new lead singer Mary Ramsey, following Natalie Merchant's departure in 1993.

Background
The two singles from the album—a cover of Roxy Music's "More Than This" and the original "Rainy Day"—were not initially intended to be included on the album. John Lombardo had just written "Rainy Day", which was deemed more radio-friendly than the other songs, and the record company insisted that the band record a cover song for inclusion. 

While Ramsey and Lombardo shared lyric writing duties, the band chose to credit the songs as group collaborations, so that all members would receive equal royalties. Ramsey wrote the music to "All That Never Happens". Guitarist John Lombardo wrote "Rainy Day", "Even with My Eyes Closed", "Big Star", "Shining Light" and "Across the Fields" and shared a writing credit with drummer Jerry Augustyniak on "Girl on a Train". Guitarist Rob Buck wrote "Love Among the Ruins" and keyboardist Dennis Drew wrote "A Room for Everything". A live version of "Rainy Day" was also included on their 2016 album Playing Favorites.

The album title is adapted from Robert Browning's poem of the same name.

Track listing
All songs written by 10,000 Maniacs, except where noted. 

 On an earlier acetate version of the album, "Smallest Step", "Beyond the Blue" and "Time Turns" were also included. When all three were omitted, the following tracks were added: "More Than This", "Rainy Day" and "All That Never Happens". All three omitted songs were re-recorded, with "Beyond the Blue" and "Time Turns" made available on U.S. and European versions of the "More Than This" single and "Smallest Step" appearing on 1999's The Earth Pressed Flat.

Release
Love Among the Ruins sold 200,000 copies, 30,000 of those within three months of release. Despite this, Geffen Records, according to Dennis Drew, "dropped us after the first three months."

Personnel
10,000 Maniacs
Mary Ramsey – lead vocals, viola
Robert Buck – electric and acoustic guitars
John Lombardo – acoustic and electric guitars
Dennis Drew – Hammond organ, piano
Steve Gustafson – bass
Jerome Augustyniak – drums, backing vocals, percussion

Additional Musicians
John Keane – guitar
Jules Shear – backing vocals
Fred Maher – percussion

Technical Staff
Billy Field – assistant engineer
Chris Lord-Alge – mixing
John Keane – producer, engineer
Fred Maher – producer
Doug Sax – mastering
John Lombardo – cover design
Mike McLaughlin – photography
Lloyd Puckett – engineer
Paul Miletti – production manager

Singles 
More Than This (U.S.)
"More Than This"
"More Than This" (Tee's Radio Edit)
"Beyond the Blue"
More Than This (Australia)
"More Than This"
"More Than This" (Tee's Radio Edit)
"Time Turns"
Rainy Day (Radio Promo Only)
"Rainy Day (Radio Edit)"
"Rainy Day (Album Version)"

References
Liner notes from 10,000 Maniacs album: Love Among the Ruins.

10,000 Maniacs albums
1997 albums
Geffen Records albums
Albums produced by Fred Maher
Albums produced by John Keane (record producer)